is a direct sales organization that develops and manufactures automation sensors, vision systems, barcode readers, laser markers, measuring instruments, and digital microscopes.

Keyence is fablessalthough it is a manufacturer; it specializes solely in product planning and development and does not manufacture the final products. Keyence products are manufactured at qualified contract manufacturing companies.

Operations
Keyence Corporation is a global company with a network of 16 international organizations that specializes in factory automation. As a direct sales company, Keyence salespeople visit customers on site with demonstration cases to show products live.

Keyence's range of products are part of the manufacturing and research processes in a variety of industries, including the electronics, semiconductor, automotive, food and packaging, biotechnology, and pharmaceutical industries.

Products
Keyence is a fabless manufacturing company that sells a broad range of products, from the photoelectric sensor and proximity sensors to measuring instruments for inspection lines to high precision microscopes used in research institutes. These products are used by more than 300,000 customers globally. Products are shipped from Keyence's warehouses in Japan, the U.S., the U.K., Canada, Germany, Italy, France, Thailand, Malaysia, Singapore, and South Korea, or from 148 agents in 31 countries.

Automation sensors
 Fiber optic sensors (FS Series)
 Photoelectric & laser sensors (LR/PR/PZ/PX/LV Series)
 Laser Distance sensors (GV & IL)
 Colour & Eye-Mark Sensors (LR-W Series)

Industrial safety
 Safety light curtains (GL Series)
 Safety laser scanners (SZ Series)

Machine vision systems and vision sensors
 Flexible machine vision systems (XG-X Series)
 Smart machine vision systems (CV-X Series)
 Vision sensors (IV Series)
 With Machine Learning (IV2/IV3)
 Barcode readers (SR Series)

Industrial Laser Markers
 UV Laser Markers (MD-U Series)
 Hybrid Laser Markers (YVO4 + Fiber) (MD-X Series)
 Fiber Laser Markers (MD-F Series)
 CO2 Laser Markers (ML-Z Series)
 Green/SHG Laser Markers (MD-T Series)

Industrial Inkjet Printer
Standard black inkjet 
Small character inkjet
Yellow inkjet
White inkjet
MEK-free inkjet

Measurement systems and sensors
 Handheld Shop Floor Coordinate-Measurement Machine (XM Series)
 Image measurement systems (IM Series)-Optical comparator
 1D laser displacement sensors (LK Series)
 2D laser displacement sensors (LJ Series)
 Optical laser scan micrometers (LS Series)
 2D Optical Micrometers (TM Series)
 Contact distance LVDT sensors (GT Series)
 Scanning laser confocal sensors (LT Series)
 Spectral-interference displacement meters (SI Series)

Advanced microscopes
 Digital microscope (VHX Series)
 Laser scanning microscope (VK Series)
 High-speed microscope (VW Series)
 Fluorescence microscope (BZ Series)

Static eliminators
 Bar-type static eliminators (SJ-H Series)
 Blower-type static eliminators (SJ-F Series)
 Spot-type static eliminators (SJ-M Series)

Programmable Logic Controllers (PLC)
 Compact type (KV-Nano Series)
 Modular type (KV-8000 Series)

Company culture and reputation
Keyence Japan is consistently listed in the Nihon Keizai Shimbun's yearly ranking of the "Top Ten Most Excellent Companies in Japan." The company maintains a strong ROE (12.32%) and a conservative equity ratio (95.54%), and it is also known as one of the top companies in Japan in terms of salaries; the average annual salary for full-time employees (average age: 35.8 years old) in FY2021 being . A 350-million-year-old ammonite fossil is displayed at the entrance of the Japanese headquarters; other fossils of long-dead creatures line the corridors and meeting rooms. Relics are supposed to convey a tacit message to employees: keep aiming high or you'll become a fossil.

Outstanding Structure Award2000
In 2000 the headquarters building was awarded the Outstanding Structure Award by the International Association for Bridge and Structural Engineering in recognition of the most remarkable, innovative, creative or otherwise stimulating structure.

References

External links
 Keyence Global Home 
 Keyence Corporation 
 Keyence UK

1974 establishments in Japan
Companies listed on the Osaka Exchange
Companies listed on the Tokyo Stock Exchange
Electronics companies established in 1974
Electronics companies of Japan
Japanese brands
Manufacturing companies based in Osaka